Bojan Miljuš (born 24 October 1994) is a Serbian football defender.

Club career

Radnički Kragujevac
Miljuš has started playing football in academy named "Fitness" in Kragujevac at the age of 6, along with his twin brother Dejan. After 5 years, they moved to the local Radnički. After he passed youth categories, Miljuš was loaned as a scholar to the Serbian League West side Pobeda Beloševac, where he was trained by Željko Milošević, former defender, and captain of Radnički Kragujevac. Playing with Pobeda, Miljuš noted 25 league appearances between 2013 and 2015.

Miljuš made his professional debut for Radnički Kragujevac in the Serbian SuperLiga match against Napredak Kruševac at Mladost Stadium on 28 February 2015, and later collected 9 matches at total until the end of season. After 2 games in the 2015–16 Serbian First League season, he left the club, and moved to Serbian League Belgrade side Teleoptik for a short spell. Returning to Radnički, Miljuš helped the team to win the Serbian League West for the 2016–17 season.

Career statistics

Club

Honours
Radnički Kragujevac
 Serbian League West: 2016–17

Personal life
Around a year after he was born, the Miljuš family moved from Knin to Kragujevac, due to Operation Storm. His twin brother, Dejan, is also a footballer.

Notes

References

External links
 Bojan Miljuš stats at utakmica.rs 
 
 

1994 births
Living people
Sportspeople from Knin
Serbs of Croatia
People from the Republic of Serbian Krajina
Association football defenders
Serbian footballers
FK Radnički 1923 players
FK Teleoptik players
Serbian First League players
Serbian SuperLiga players
Twin sportspeople